Short Eyes is a studio album released under Curtom Records and the soundtrack to Robert M. Young's 1977 film  based upon the play of the same name by Miguel Piñero. The album contains one of Mayfield's last funk hits, "Do Do Wap is Strong in Here".

Track listing
 “Do Do Wap is Strong in Here” - 5:28
 “Back Against the Wall” - 6:34
 “Need Someone to Love” - 3:11
 “A Heavy Dude” - 4:07
 “Short Eyes/Freak, Freak, Free, Free, Free” - 5:40
 “Break It Down” (H.P. Denenberg, Martin Hirch) - 4:17
 “Another Fool in Love” - 3:20
 “Father Confessor" (Instrumental) - 2:40

Personnel 
 Curtis Mayfield - vocals, lead guitar
 Gary Thompson - rhythm guitar
 Floyd Morris - keyboards
 Rich Tufo - keyboards, arranger
 Henry Gibson - bongos, congas
 Joseph Scott - bass
 Donnell Hagan - drums
 LeRoy Hutson, Alfonso Surrett, Ricki Linton, and Mystique - background vocals
 Inner sleeve of album.

Later Samples
"Short Eyes"
"Turn It Up" by Ashanti featuring Ja Rule from the album Concrete Rose (2004).
"American Gangster" by Jay-Z from the album American Gangster (2007)
"Do Do Wap Is Strong in Here"
"Real Hip Hop" by Jadakiss featuring Sheek Louch from Kiss of Death (2004)

References

Curtis Mayfield soundtracks
1977 soundtrack albums
Drama film soundtracks
Albums produced by Curtis Mayfield
Curtom Records albums